Carol Williams may refer to:

 Carol Williams (politician) (born 1949), majority leader of the Montana State Senate
 Carol Williams (organist) (born 1962), American organist and composer
 Carol Williams (disco musician), American singer and songwriter who achieved success in the 1970s
 Carol Lynch Williams, author of young adult novels
 Carroll Williams (1916–1991), entomologist